Littorina aleutica is a species of sea snail, a marine gastropod mollusk in the family Littorinidae, the winkles or periwinkles.

Distribution
Locality: Aleutian Islands, Fox Islands, Akutan Pass, Alaska, United States, North Pacific Ocean

References

Littorinidae
Marine molluscs of North America
Fauna of Alaska
Aleutian Islands
Molluscs of the United States
Gastropods described in 1872
Endemic fauna of Alaska